Psilocybe liniformans is a mushroom in the family Hymenogastraceae. It is in the section Semilanceatae of Psilocybe.

Description
The stipe of Psilocybe liniformans is 5.5-7.5 cm long. The cap is 4.5-7.5 cm wide. The latter is initially pointed bell-shaped and flattens with age. The red-brown, glossy cap fades to the edge of yellow-brownish. The lamellae are yellowish brown to dark yellowish brown. The spore print is brown to dark brown. The cylindrical and full-length grooved stipe is pale yellow. In the upper third of the stipe carries a whitish ring. The stipe and cap may colour blue when damaged.

Similar species
Psilocybe liniformans is phylogenetically a close relative of Psilocybe fimetaria. Not only do they often grow in the same habitat, but they are macroscopically similar. The best way to differentiate the species by testing for the presence of separable gelatinous threads running along the bottom of the gills. This feature indicates Psilocybe liniformans.

Habitat and distribution
Psilocybe liniformans can be found growing in the Netherlands, England and other nearby European countries. It grows exclusively from herbivore dung, usually that of horses, and often fruits gregariously.

References

liniformans
Taxa named by Gastón Guzmán